South Longford was a parliamentary constituency in Ireland, which returned one Members of Parliament (MP) to the House of Commons of the Parliament of the United Kingdom.

Before the 1885 general election and after the dissolution of Parliament in 1918 the area was part of the Longford constituency.

Boundaries

This constituency comprised the southern part of County Longford.

1885–1918: The baronies of Moydow, Rathcline and Shrule, and those parts of the baronies of Ardagh and Longford not contained within the constituency of North Longford.

Members of Parliament

1Nationalist from 1900

Elections

Elections in the 1880s

 

Connolly resigns, causing a by-election.

Elections in the 1890s

Elections in the 1900s

 

Blake resigns, causing a by-election.

Elections in the 1910s

 

Phillips dies, causing a by-election.

References

Westminster constituencies in County Longford (historic)
Constituencies of the Parliament of the United Kingdom established in 1885
Constituencies of the Parliament of the United Kingdom disestablished in 1918